Sanford station may refer to:

 Sanford station (Amtrak), an Amtrak Auto Train station
 Sanford station (Atlantic Coast Line), a former rail station
 Sanford station (SunRail), a commuter rail station
 Sanford station (Danbury and Norwalk Railroad), a former rail station

See also
 Sanford (disambiguation)
 Stanford station, Caltrain station in Palo Alto, California, United States